Texas Homecare was a chain of do it yourself (DIY) stores in the United Kingdom and Ireland. The firm operated from 1972 until 1996, with some stores lasting until 1999.

History
Texas Homecare was first established in 1972 by Manny, Sydney and Gerald Fogel, who had previously founded the high street specialist paint and wallpaper chain Home Charm. Using an American business model as inspiration, they revolutionised the UK's DIY market. Texas specialised in higher-volume, lower-margin DIY products. However, in the 1980s the company was adversely affected by the recession and depressed housing market, and was acquired first by Ladbrokes and later by J Sainsbury plc, before merging with and being replaced by Homebase.

Acquisition
Having acquired Texas Homecare in 1986, Ladbrokes sold the business to J Sainsbury in 1995. At the time of the purchase, Texas had more than 11,600 staff, while Homebase had c. 4,500. As part of the acquisition, 26 Texas stores closed and Sainsbury's converted the remaining stores to the Homebase brand. The conversion to Homebase was completed in 1999, when the Texas Homecare brand was discontinued. 

In 2000, the former chief executive of Texas Homecare, Ron Trenter, made an unsuccessful bid for Homebase.

Advertising
In its early years, Texas was famous for its television advertising slogan: 'Texas — THE BIG ONE!'. In later years, the company used a fictional character, Texas Tom, in its advertising. During the early 1990s, this campaign was altered slightly, referring to 'Only At Tom's Place!'.

See also
 Homebase
 Great Mills
 Do It All
 Payless DIY

References

External links
Texas Homecare
Texas Tom TV advert from the 1980s

1972 establishments in the United Kingdom
1999 disestablishments in the United Kingdom
Retail companies established in 1972
Defunct retail companies of the United Kingdom
Home improvement companies of the United Kingdom
Retail companies disestablished in 1999
Sainsbury's
1986 mergers and acquisitions
1995 mergers and acquisitions